Eugenio Jose "Bong" Villarreal Lacson (born December 13, 1959) is a Filipino politician serving as the governor of Negros Occidental since 2019. He previously served as the province's vice governor from 2013 to 2019, and was the mayor of San Carlos, Negros Occidental from 2001 to 2010.

Political career

Mayoralty
Bong Lacson served for three consecutive terms as City Mayor of San Carlos, Negros Occidental.

Vice Governorship
He ran under the ticket of former Vice-Governor Genaro Alvarez as the vice-gubernatorial candidate. Eventually, he won the polls but his running mate lost to the incumbent Governor Alfredo G. Marañon Jr.

Despite belonging to the opposition and holding the majority in the Negros Occidental Provincial Board, he maintained a good relationship with the Governor. He decided not to run against Governor Marañon, though the governor fielded Rep. Jeffrey Ferrer as his running mate, after failed reunification talks between United Negros Alliance and his coalition, the Love Negros Alliance.

References

External links
Province of Negros Occidental Official website

|-

|-

1959 births
Living people
Mayors of places in Negros Occidental
Nationalist People's Coalition politicians
Filipino Roman Catholics
People from San Carlos, Negros Occidental
Governors of Negros Occidental